Borujen County is in Chaharmahal and Bakhtiari province, Iran. The capital of the county is the city of Borujen. At the 2006 census the county's population was 113,795, in 27,963 households. The following census in 2011 counted 118,681 people in 32,649 households. At the 2016 census the county's population was 122,483, in 36,238 households.

Administrative divisions

The population history and structural changes of Borujen County's administrative divisions over three consecutive censuses are shown in the following table. The latest census shows three districts, five rural districts, and six cities.

References

 

Counties of Chaharmahal and Bakhtiari Province